First-seeded Maureen Connolly defeated Ginette Bucaille 6–4, 6–1 in the final to win the women's singles tennis title at the 1954 French Championships.

Seeds
The seeded players are listed below. Maureen Connolly is the champion; others show the round in which they were eliminated.

  Maureen Connolly (champion)
  Nelly Adamson (semifinals)
  Helen Fletcher (first round)
  Silvana Lazzarino (semifinals)
  Anne-Marie Seghers (quarterfinals)
  Baba Mercedes Lewis (third round)
  Yola Ramírez (third round)
  Toto Zehden (third round)
 n/a
  Dorothy Levine (quarterfinals)
  Ginette Bucaille (finalist)
  Jacqueline Kermina (third round)
  A. Baxter (first round)
  Pilar Barril (second round)
  Shirley Bloomer (third round)
  Nicla Migliori (second round)

Draw

Key
 Q = Qualifier
 WC = Wild card
 LL = Lucky loser
 r = Retired

Finals

Earlier rounds

Section 1

Section 2

Section 3

Section 4

References

External links
   on the French Open website

1954 in tennis
1954
1954 in French women's sport
1954 in French tennis